The following is a list of episodes for Viper's Creed, which had aired on the Animax and BS11 channels in Japan since January 6, 2009. It was created by Sony Pictures Japan and animated by AIC Spirits and Digital Frontier. The roles of Saiki Cryde and Kariya Sakurako, the main characters of the show, were given to voice actors Takaya Kuroda and Megumi Toyoguchi.

Viper's Creed takes place in the near future where a PMC named Arqon Global Security is mandated to provide law enforcement and self-defense protection for the people of Fort Daiva City, a city rebuilt over the ruins of abandoned and flooded cities after the Earth was affected by global warming followed by a third world war which nearly destroyed the world.

Hiroyuki Kanbe is the director of Viper's Creed with Shinji Aramaki being the show's main chief director after screenplay writer Ai Ōta announced on her blog that Shinji Aramaki would be involved in the conception of the show. Viper's Creed uses one opening and ending song. The opening is called R.O.C.K. by iLL with a CD single released on January 28, 2009 while the ending  is sung in English by moumoon, which was released as a CD single and as a CD single with a DVD on February 25, 2009.

Region 2 DVDs of Viper's Creed have been released in Japan with 3 episodes each. As of October 2009, Volume 1 was released on August 5, 2009 with Volume 2 released on September 2, 2009. Volume 3 was released on October 7, 2009.

Episode list

References

Viper's Creed